Hilliard Towers Apartments, formerly known as the Raymond Hilliard Homes CHA housing project, is a residential high-rise development in the near South Side of Chicago, Illinois. It was designed by Bertrand Goldberg and is bounded by Clark Street, State Street, Cullerton Street, and Cermak Road. In 1999, it was placed on the National Register of Historic Places as the Raymond M. Hilliard Center Historic District. The development was named for Raymond Marcellus Hilliard, who was the director of the Cook County Department of Welfare from 1954 until his death in 1966.

Construction
Design began in 1963, with the increasing demand for affordable public housing and urban renewal projects growing in popularity throughout the country. Goldberg designed the structure to be supported almost exclusively by the outer shell, as opposed to Marina City, which was supported by its core. His opinion of other public housing projects was that they were developed in such a way as to punish residents for being poor; Goldberg wanted to design a home that residents would be proud of. Residents were vetted carefully and as a result, crime and social problems at Hilliard Homes were considerably lower than at other CHA housing projects. It was the only project never to require a uniformed police detail. The twin cylindrical towers were reserved for seniors and the two adjoining half-circle buildings were reserved for low-income families.

Redevelopment
By the early 1990s, the buildings had fallen into disrepair. In 1997, the CHA initiated a process of financing and redevelopment that  spanned 9 years, ending in 2006. The property is currently mixed-income, with a combination of middle-class residents paying market rate, plus low-income families and senior citizens with Section 8 vouchers.

References 

Public housing in Chicago
Residential skyscrapers in Chicago
South Side, Chicago
Historic districts in Chicago
National Register of Historic Places in Chicago
Residential buildings completed in 1966
Round buildings
Bertrand Goldberg buildings
Modernist architecture in Illinois
Historic districts on the National Register of Historic Places in Illinois
1966 establishments in Illinois